Remember Me (stylized in all caps) is the sixth extended play (EP) by South Korean girl group Oh My Girl. It was released by WM Entertainment on September 10, 2018 and distributed by Kakao M. The album contains five songs, including the single "Remember Me".

Release and promotion
On August 21, 2018, Oh My Girl's agency WM Entertainment revealed that the group had recently completed music video shooting for a comeback planned the following month. A showcase was held in the evening of September 10 to commemorate the release of the new record. Remember Me is the group's sixth extended play, released in "Pink" and "Violet" versions. The day after the album's official release, Oh My Girl had their comeback stage for Remember Me on the music program The Show, performing the single "Remember Me" on television. They won their second music show award from the same program on September 18.

Commercial performance
The album debuted at number three on South Korea's Weekly Gaon Album Chart and at number eight on the Monthly Gaon Album Chart, selling 21,911 by the end of September. The title track also peaked at number 36 on the Gaon Digital Chart and at number 4 on the Gaon Download Chart.

Track listing

Charts

References

Oh My Girl albums
2018 EPs
Korean-language EPs
Kakao M EPs